Winey is a surname. Notable people with the surname include:

Brandon Winey (born 1978), American football player
Karen I. Winey, American materials scientist
Ken Winey (born 1962), American football player
Mark Winey, American biologist

See also
Wigney
WINY